Charles Justin Bailey (June 21, 1859 – September 21, 1946) was a major general in the United States Army who commanded the 81st Infantry Division during World War I.

Early life

He was born in Tamaqua, Pennsylvania on June 21, 1859.  He graduated from the United States Military Academy in 1880 and in the same year was commissioned a second lieutenant in the 1st Artillery Regiment.

Start of career
Bailey specialized in coastal artillery, and his earliest assignments included postings to: Fort Adams, Rhode Island; Fort Canby, Washington; the Presidio of San Francisco; Alcatraz Citadel, California; and Fort Mason.  He was a student at the Fort Monroe, Virginia Artillery School in 1888, after which he was promoted to first lieutenant.

In the 1890s, Bailey's assignments included: the staff of the 1st Artillery at Fort Hamilton, New York; the staff of the Artillery District of New Orleans at Jackson Barracks; and professor of Military Science at the University of Vermont.  In 1898 he received the honorary degree of Master of Arts from UVM.

Spanish–American War
During the Spanish–American War, Bailey served at Fort San Jacinto, Texas as commander of Battery G, 1st Artillery Regiment, and then at Fort Preble, Maine, where he commanded a battery of the 7th Artillery Regiment. He was promoted to captain in 1899.

Post-Spanish–American War
After the war, Bailey serve at Sandy Hook Proving Ground until 1902. From 1902 to 1904 he was stationed at Fort Totten, New York and assigned to disburse funds on programs for acquiring and employing mines for defense U.S. harbors, as well as serving on a board that conducted experiments with using torpedoes for coastal defense. In 1905 he was promoted to major and assigned as commander of the Artillery District of New Orleans at Jackson Barracks. He subsequently served on the General Staff at the War Department and as Secretary of the Army War College. From 1908 to 1911, he was senior assistant to the Chief of Coast Artillery. He was promoted to colonel in 1911 and brigadier general in 1913.

From 1911 to 1913, Bailey commanded the 1st Provisional Coast Artillery Regiment at Fort Crockett, Texas. In 1913 he was assigned to command the coast defenses of Puget Sound, Washington, after which he returned to Fort Totten as commander of the North Atlantic Coast Artillery District. From 1914 to 1917 he commanded the coastal defenses of Manila and Subic Bays in the Philippines.

World War I

On August 5, 1917, Bailey was promoted to major general in the National Army and assigned to command the Philippine Department.  In 1918 he was assigned as commander of the 81st Division, which he commanded in France from 1918 to 1919.

Post-World War I
In 1919, Bailey was selected to command the Middle Atlantic Coast Artillery District at Fort Totten, and returned to his permanent rank of brigadier general. He assumed command of Department of the East at Governors Island, New York on October 13, 1919.

He then commanded the 7th Division at Fort Meade, Maryland.  He was again promoted to major general, and commanded the Third Corps area at Fort Howard, Maryland until retiring in 1922.

Awards and decorations
He was awarded the Distinguished Service Medal, the Order of Leopold (Belgium), the Croix de Guerre with palm, and was an officer of the Legion of Honor.

Death and burial
He suffered a hip fracture in a fall in July 1945 and never fully recovered. He died on September 21, 1946 at his home in Jamestown, New York.  Bailey was buried at Lake View Cemetery in Jamestown.

Family
In 1885, Bailey married Mary M. Dodge.  They were the parents of two daughters, Omira and Merry.  Omira Bailey was the wife of Army Colonel Alexander Wheeler Chilton, and Merry was the wife of Army Colonel Charles Lewis Gandy.

Bailey's first wife died in 1923.  In 1924, he married Elizabeth Hegeman Bailey.

References

Sources

Internet

Books

Further reading
Jonathan Dembo, ed., A Life of Duty: The Autobiography of George Willcox McIver, 1858-1947 (2006), n. 148.  Searchable at  Amazon listing.

External links

1859 births
1946 deaths
Military personnel from Pennsylvania
Officiers of the Légion d'honneur
People from Tamaqua, Pennsylvania
Recipients of the Distinguished Service Medal (US Army)
United States Army generals of World War I
United States Military Academy alumni
University of Vermont faculty
Burials at Lake View Cemetery (Penn Yan, New York)